Milan Ferenčík (born 13 February 1991) is a Slovak football forward who currently plays for SV Karlstetten/Neidling. He made his debut for FC Baník Ostrava against FC Hradec Králové on 10 April 2011.

References

External links

FC Baník profile

1991 births
Living people
Sportspeople from Senica
Slovak footballers
Association football forwards
FC Baník Ostrava players
FK Dukla Banská Bystrica players
Spartak Myjava players
FK Senica players
Czech First League players
Slovak Super Liga players
Slovak expatriate footballers
Expatriate footballers in the Czech Republic
Slovak expatriate sportspeople in the Czech Republic
Expatriate footballers in Germany
Expatriate footballers in Austria